The Other Rio is a Canadian documentary film, directed by Émilie B. Guérette and released in 2017. Set against the backdrop of the 2016 Summer Olympics in Rio de Janeiro, the film profiles a community of squatters living in poverty who are left out of the public image the city is trying to cultivate on the international stage.

The film premiered in 2017 at the Montreal International Documentary Festival.

In 2019, Étienne Roussy received a Canadian Screen Award nomination for Best Cinematography in Documentary at the 7th Canadian Screen Awards.

References

External links

2017 films
2017 documentary films
Canadian documentary films
Films shot in Rio de Janeiro (city)
2010s Canadian films